Clan is a Spanish free-to-air television channel owned and operated by Televisión Española (TVE), the television division of state-owned public broadcaster Radiotelevisión Española (RTVE). It is the corporation's television channel for kids, and is known for its programming for children between the ages of two and twelve.

It was launched on 12 December 2005 and until 1 January 2007 it had time-shared with TVE 50 Años which has since closed. The service now broadcasts 24 hours a day.

Clan is available free on digital terrestrial television (known as TDT in Spain) and on major subscription platforms. Although the channel primarily screens programming for children aged from two to twelve, programming for older audiences is shown during the evening and night. A mixture of Spanish and foreign programming is shown, all in the Spanish language, both live-action and animated. Some programs feature a sign-language interpreter as well. Because of this, the channel is regarded as a useful platform for primary school teachers. Musical programs such as Operacion Triunfo, the Eurovision Song Contest and Junior Eurovision Song Contest are also broadcast on the channel.

References

External links
Clan TVE
Clan TVE Schedule
Clan TVE at LyngSat Address

RTVE channels
Television stations in Spain
Children's television networks
Television channels and stations established in 2005
Spanish-language television stations
2005 establishments in Spain